Lily is an unincorporated community in Langlade County, Wisconsin, United States, located within the town of Langlade. Lily is at the intersection of Wisconsin State Highway 52 and Wisconsin State Highway 55.

The Town of Langlade Town Hall and Fire Department are located in Lily.

The Wisconsin Central Ltd Railroad (Formerly Soo Line) ran a line through Lily up until 2001 when the tracks were ripped up. The railroad grade is now the Wolf River State Trail.

Lily is also a junction for many area snowmobile and ATV trails. The Lily Sno-Birds Clubhouse is located on Turtle Lake Road, and there is also a small racetrack located there where snowmobiles and ATVs have raced in the past.  The track is currently dormant.

Images

References

Unincorporated communities in Wisconsin
Unincorporated communities in Langlade County, Wisconsin